Project Titan or Titan Project may refer to:

 Apple electric car project, with autonomous driving
Tesla subsidiary SolarCity's project to secretly replace defective solar panels
 Titan (Blizzard Entertainment project).
 Time Crisis: Project Titan, a 2001 videogame
 "Project Titan", a fictional spacecraft from Titan A.E.
 "ProjectTitan" as the SmartGaGa project
 Titan Project, a defunct MMO videogame in the Halo (series)

See also
 Titan (disambiguation)
 Projekt TYTAN, Polish military project
 Titan Wind Project, windfarm